Osteria Mozza is a Michelin Guide-starred Italian restaurant in Los Angeles, California.

In 2007, Nancy Silverton partnered with New York chef Mario Batali and his frequent collaborator Joseph Bastianich to open an Italian restaurant, Osteria Mozza.  Reminiscent of the evolution of La Brea Bakery, a pizzeria, Pizzeria Mozza, opened in an adjoining space prior to the opening of the main restaurant.  It was met with an "instant and outsize swoon."  The Los Angeles Times gave it a four-star review, and the New York Times called it a "serious and impressive restaurant."

Four months after the opening of the pizzeria, Osteria Mozza opened to similar acclaim.  Although the restaurant's entire menu was widely praised, Silverton's interpretation of antipasti as a Mozzarella bar won particular recognition, with Zagat's noting that she had "perfected the art of cheese."  It was nominated as Best New Restaurant by the James Beard Foundation the year it opened, and was awarded a Michelin star in 2008. Osteria Mozza maintained its Michelin star in the 2022 Michelin Guide for California.

Osteria Mozza later opened restaurants in Newport Beach, California (Pizzeria Mozza), and Singapore.  The original Mozza location has since grown to include Mozza2Go and a third restaurant, Chi Spacca, which focuses on meats.

See also
 List of Italian restaurants
 List of Michelin starred restaurants in Los Angeles and Southern California

References

External links

2007 establishments in California
Restaurants established in 2007
Michelin Guide starred restaurants in California
European restaurants in Los Angeles
Italian restaurants in California